Simone Veil, A Woman of the Century is a French biographical drama film written and directed by Olivier Dahan. The film stars Elsa Zylberstein, Rebecca Marder, Olivier Gourmet and Elodie Bouchez.

Cast
The cast include:
 Elsa Zylberstein as Simone Veil
 Rebecca Marder
 Olivier Gourmet
 Elodie Bouchez

Production
The film began principal photography on September 9, 2019 and concluded on December 4, 2019, after 13 weeks of filming. It takes place in Paris and La Ciotat and also in Budapest, Hungary.

References

External links
 

2022 films
2020s French-language films
2022 drama films
French biographical drama films